The 30th Producers Guild of America Awards (also known as 2019 Producers Guild Awards), honoring the best film and television producers of 2018, were held at The Beverly Hilton in Beverly Hills, California on January 19, 2019. The nominations in the documentary category were announced on November 20, 2018 and the other nominations for film and television were announced on January 4, 2019.

Winners and nominees

Film

Television

Milestone Award
 Toby Emmerich

Stanley Kramer Award
 Jane Fonda

Visionary Award
 Kenya Barris

David O. Selznick Achievement Award in Theatrical Motion Pictures
 Kevin Feige

Norman Lear Achievement Award in Television
 Amy Sherman-Palladino

References

External links
 PGA Awards website

 2018
2018 film awards
2018 television awards